Dodge County Airport  is a county-owned public-use airport in Dodge County, Wisconsin, United States. It is located two nautical miles (4 km) north of the central business district of Juneau, Wisconsin.  It is situated along Wisconsin Highway 26.

It is included in the Federal Aviation Administration (FAA) National Plan of Integrated Airport Systems for 2021–2025, in which it is categorized as a regional general aviation facility.

Facilities and aircraft 
Dodge County Airport covers an area of 580 acres (235 ha) at an elevation of 934 feet (285 m) above mean sea level. It has two asphalt paved runways: 8/26 is 5,070 by 100 feet (1,545 x 30 m) and LOC/DME equipped; 2/20 is 4,028 by 75 feet (1,228 x 23 m).

For the 12-month period ending May 24, 2021, the airport had 29,000 aircraft operations, an average of 79 per day: 94% general aviation, 3% air taxi and 3% military. In January 2023, there were 50 aircraft based at this airport: 45 single-engine, 4 multi-engine and 1 jet.

The JUNEAU (UNU) non-directional beacon, 344 kHz, is located on the field.

Wisconsin Aviation is the fixed-base operator for the airport.

See also 
 List of airports in Wisconsin

References

External links 
 Dodge County Airport page at Dodge County website
 Wisconsin Aviation: Juneau (UNU), the fixed-base operator (FBO)
  at the Wisconsin DOT airport directory
 Aerial image as of April 1993 from USGS The National Map
 

Airports in Wisconsin
Buildings and structures in Dodge County, Wisconsin